The discography of Lifetime, a punk rock band from New Jersey, United States consists of four studio albums, four extended plays, two compilation albums and a handful of tracks released on various other compilations.

Studio albums

Extended plays

Compilations

Music videos

Other appearances
 Horizon Records Hardcore Compilation (Horizon Records, 1991)
 Lifetime contribute a live version of "Alive".
 It's For Life (Consequence Records, 1992 / Victory Records, 1995)
 Lifetime contributes "Up" from the Background LP.
 Eternity - An East Coast Hardcore Compilation (Outback Records, 1994)
 Lifetime contributes "Secede" which was later featured on the Seven Inches collection.
 Music Does A Body Good (Glue Records, 1994)
 Lifetime contributes "New England" (originally recorded by Billy Bragg) which was later collected on the Seven Inches collection.
 Land of Greed... World Of Need (Watermark / Trustkill Records, 1994)
 Lifetime contributes "Money" (originally recorded by Embrace) which was later collected on the Seven Inches collection.
 Anti-Matter (Another Planet Records, 1996)
 Lifetime contributes an alternate version of "Theme Song for a New Brunswick Basement Show" which was later remixed for the Somewhere in the Swamps of Jersey collection.
 The Tie That Binds (Nevermore Records, 1996)
 Lifetime contributes and alternate version of "Bringing It Backwards" which was later remixed for the Somewhere in the Swamps of Jersey collection.
 Punk Uprisings Vol. 2 (Go-Kart Records, 1997)
 Lifetime contributes an alternate version of "Young, Loud, and Scotty" which was later remixed for the Somewhere in the Swamps of Jersey collection.

References

Discographies of American artists
Punk rock group discographies